UFC 95: Sanchez vs. Stevenson was a mixed martial arts event held by the Ultimate Fighting Championship (UFC) on February 21, 2009, at The O2 Arena in London, United Kingdom.

Background
The event was broadcast live for viewers in Europe and Canada and later tape delayed for U.S. viewers on Spike. The bout was headlined by season one and two winners of The Ultimate Fighter.

Neil Grove was originally scheduled to face Justin McCully, but the bout was cancelled when McCully withdrew from the fight.  Grove instead faced Mike Ciesnolevicz.

Per Eklund was originally scheduled to face David Baron, but the bout was cancelled when Baron withdrew from the fight.  Eklund instead faced Evan Dunham.

Terry Etim was originally scheduled to face Justin Buchholz, but the bout was cancelled when Buchholz had a staph infection.  He was replaced by UFC newcomer Brian Cobb.

Stefan Struve made his UFC debut at this event.

The event drew an average of 2.4 million viewers on Spike TV.

Results

Bonus awards
Fighters were awarded $40,000 bonuses.

Fight of the Night: Diego Sanchez vs. Joe Stevenson
Knockout of the Night: Paulo Thiago
Submission of the Night: Demian Maia

See also
 Ultimate Fighting Championship
 List of UFC champions
 List of UFC events
 2009 in UFC

References

External links
Official card

Ultimate Fighting Championship events
2009 in mixed martial arts
Mixed martial arts in the United Kingdom
Sport in the Royal Borough of Greenwich
2009 sports events in London
February 2009 sports events in the United Kingdom